The barwings are the genus Actinodura of passerine birds in the family Leiothrichidae. They are found in the hills of Southern Asia, from Eastern India to China and Taiwan.

Species
The genus contains nine species:

References

 Collar, N. J. & Robson C. 2007. Family Timaliidae (Babblers)  pp. 70 – 291 in; del Hoyo, J., Elliott, A. & Christie, D.A. eds. Handbook of the Birds of the World, Vol. 12. Picathartes to Tits and Chickadees. Lynx Edicions, Barcelona.

 
Bird genera
Leiothrichidae
Taxonomy articles created by Polbot